Allium stipitatum, Persian shallot, is an Asian  species of onion native to central and southwestern Asia.

Some sources regard Allium stipitatum and A. hirtifolium as the same species, while others treat A. stipitatum and A. hirtifolium as distinct. Allium stipitatum in the more inclusive sense occurs in Turkey, Iraq, Iran, Pakistan, Afghanistan, Turkmenistan, Tajikistan, Uzbekistan, Kyrgyzstan, and Kazakhstan.

The epithet stipitatum means 'with a little stalk' referring to the ovary.

Description
Allium stipitatum grows from bulbs, 3 to 6 cm in diameter, which have blackish, paper-like tunics. The 4–6 basal leaves are broad, green to greyish green in colour, and variably hairy. The leaves are normally withered by the time the bulb flowers. Individual flowers, of which there are many, are a typical allium shape, with a superior ovary and six tepals of a lilac to purple colour, around 2.5 to 5 cm long; white forms are known.

It is a typical 'drumstick allium', with a more-or-less spherical umbel on a tall stipe, and as such has often been confused with other similar species.

Use in Persian cuisine

Bulbs of Allium stipitatum are eaten in Iran, where they are called موسیر (pronounced /muːˈsiːɾ/). They grow wild across the Zagros Mountains. Most of those eaten are harvested from the wild, sliced, dried, and sold at markets. Buyers will often soak the shallots for a number of days then boil them to obtain a milder flavour. They are often crushed and mixed with yogurt. Iranians enjoy yogurt in this way, especially in restaurants and kebab-saras where just kebabs are served.

Iranian plants are among those referred to as A. hirtifolium, when distinguished from A. stipitatum.

Ornamental use
Mathew describes this species as "stately", and the easiest to grow of the tall alliums, flowering in about four years when grown from seed. In keeping with the wild habitat of the species, when grown for ornament, well-drained, sunny conditions are recommended. Care is needed in placing all the drumstick alliums, since their withered leaves are unattractive at flowering time. Davies notes that "as a bonus numerous offsets are produced"; this has the potential to make the species invasive when grown in borders.

The cultivars ‘Mount Everest’ 
and ‘Violet Beauty’ 
have gained the Royal Horticultural Society’s Award of Garden Merit.

Medicinal properties and health effects 
Allium stipitatum is used as a medicinal plant in Central Asia. Extracts of the bulbs of the plant, which showed activity against Mycobacterium tuberculosis, were found to contain several pyridine-N-oxide derivatives. Analysis of the cut plant using a mass spectrometer equipped with a DART ion source showed the presence of N-hydroxypyridine-2-thione, also known as pyrithione, a compound which is moderately cytotoxic toward human tumour cell lines, and highly active against fungi and Gram-negative bacteria. Pyrithione-containing plant extracts are used in herbal medicine for treatment of malaria. Zinc pyrithione is used in commercial anti-dandruff shampoos.

References

stipitatum
Onions
Plants described in 1881
Flora of temperate Asia